The 1895/96 Football League season was the eighth in Football League history with Everton having been an ever present in the top division. The club played thirty-three games in England's two major competitions, winning eighteen, drawing seven and losing eight. The club finished the season in third place, six points adrift of Champions Aston Villa, and were defeated in the quarter final of the F A Cup by eventual winners The Wednesday. Their Goodison Park home hosted the drawn semi final between Wednesday and Bolton Wanderers.

Season review
The Everton board kept faith in the squad that had finished runners up the previous season with no major signings or departures during the summer. This meant that Jack Hillman was the undisputed first choice goalkeeper for the season and would go on to play all bar the final game in which Harry Briggs made his club debut in a 2–1 victory at Stoke. Bob Kelso, Charlie Parry and James Adams resumed their battle for the two full back positions from the previous season. Adams missed the first game of the season but returned to miss just one other game as he established himself as the first choice full back but Both Kelso and Parry fell out of favour as reserve, Smart Arridge emerged as a solid full back partner to Adams. Kelso, who played the first five games of the season, made just one further appearance for the club in the half back line before leaving to join Dundee in February. Parry's long love, hate relationship with the Goodison Park club finally came to an end after his second appearance of the season when he gave away a penalty, which was missed, in a 3–4 defeat at Aston Villa in September. Before the year was out the Welsh International defender had moved on to Ardwick.

The solid half back line of Dickie Boyle, Johnny Holt and Billy Stewart, considered so instrumental in the club's title push last year was unsurprisingly unaltered and the trio continued in the same vein as they had done the previous year. Hugh Goldie, a summer signing from St Mirren proved a successful reserve when required and regularly filled in for the regular trio when required.

Everton were strongest in the forward line where Jack Bell, Tom McInnes, Edgar Chadwick and Alf Milward remained regulars but the club's record hat-trick scorer, Alex Latta began to find opportunities limited as he slipped down the pecking order behind Abe Hartley. The arrival of John Cameron, yet another Scot, from Queens Park, in September  further reduced Latta's opportunities and he left before the end of the season for local rivals Liverpool.

While the club seemed prepared to mount a fresh title challenge on the field, they were anything but prepared off it as chairman, George Mahon announced a healthy £6,000 profit at the club agm before promptly resigning, along with four other directors over 'acute administrative difficulties'. Six new directors were elected along with a new Chairman, Dr Baxter who pushed through the building of a new stand on the Bullens Road end of the ground and put a roof on the Goodison Road Stand.

The club made an indifferent start to the League campaign, winning four, drawing three and losing four of their first eleven games before embarking on a run of nine consecutive victories from November to January that took them top of the table and marked them as favourites to win their second League Title.

The Toffeemen were knocked off the top of the table on 4 January when Derby County won a game in hand to go a point clear. The Merseysiders' title challenge stuttered in the first three months of the year, winning just two of their next six games and leaving the club six points adrift of Aston Villa but with four games and eight points to play for against Villa's two remaining games. On 3 April Everton embarked on a hectic schedule of four games in eight days to win the title but their hopes were dashed at the first hurdle when a 2–2 draw at home to Derby County was coupled with victory for Villa at Nottingham Forest to leave Everton seven points adrift with just three games to play.

The Toffeemen finished the season in third position, six points behind champions, Villa, one place and three points worse off than when finishing Runners Up the previous season.

In the F.A. Cup Everton came through their first two ties comfortably defeating top flight opponents Nottingham Forest in Nottingham and Sheffield United at Goodison Park to an aggregate of 5–0. However confidence was low when the side traveled to Sheffield Wednesday on quarter final day, just nine days after the side had lost a League game at the same venue 1–3. They fared even worse in the cup tie, losing 0–4 to the eventual cup winners.

Final league table

Key: P = Matches played; W = Matches won; D = Matches drawn; L = Matches lost; F = Goals for; A = Goals against; GA = Goal average; Pts = Points

The Football League
Everton home games were played at Goodison Park while away games were played at the venues stated

Football Association Challenge Cup

Source: Everton Stats.

First Team Squad and Appearances

References

Everton F.C. seasons
Everton